"She Blinded Me with Science" is a song by the English musician Thomas Dolby, released in 1982. It was first released as a single in the UK in October 1982. It was subsequently included on the EP Blinded by Science and the 1983 re-release of Dolby's debut album The Golden Age of Wireless.

Although viewed as a success in both the United States and Canada, peaking at No. 5 on the Billboard Hot 100 and 2 weeks at No. 1 in Canada's RPM Magazine, the song barely managed to score among the Top 50 in Dolby's native United Kingdom, peaking at No. 49 on the UK Singles Chart in 1982.

Dolby is often considered a one-hit wonder in the United States on the basis of the song's chart success there. In 2002, US cable television network VH1 named "She Blinded Me with Science" No. 20 on its list of the "100 Greatest One-hit Wonders". While the song is Dolby's only Top 40 single on the Billboard Hot 100, he has had other songs that scored on the music charts. In 2006, VH1 placed it at No. 76 on their list of "Greatest Songs of the '80s". Then, in 2009, it ranked No. 13 o n VH1's "100 Greatest One Hit Wonders of the 80s" list.  The song was used as the theme song in the pilot episode of "The Big Bang Theory" before it was replaced with the "Big Bang Theory Theme" by rock band Barenaked Ladies.

Song structure
The song features exclamations from the British scientist and TV presenter Magnus Pyke, who repeatedly interjects "Science!" and delivers other lines in a deliberately caricatured mad scientist manner, such as, "Good heavens, Miss Sakamoto, you're beautiful!"

Music video
The video for "She Blinded Me with Science" was conceived and storyboarded before the song was written. Dolby added the song title, wrote the song to fit the planned video, and then directed the music video. The video features Magnus Pyke as The Doctor, at "The Home for Deranged Scientists".

Dolby later said that he wrote the line "Good heavens, Miss Sakamoto" because he wanted a Japanese woman to appear in the video. He was quoted with saying. "I was boldly ahead of the times in fetishizing Asian women,"

Chart positions

Weekly charts

Year-end charts

See also
List of number-one singles of 1983 (Canada)

References

External links
Thomas Dolby – The Making of "She Blinded Me with Science" on YouTube

1982 songs
1982 singles
Thomas Dolby songs
RPM Top Singles number-one singles
Capitol Records singles
Songs about science